Parliamentary elections were held in Portugal on 29 April 1906. The result was a victory for the Regeneration Party, which won 104 seats. The one elected Portuguese Republican Party MP refused to take his seat in protest at electoral fraud.

Results

The results exclude seats from overseas territories.

References

Legislative elections in Portugal
1906 elections in Europe
1906 elections in Portugal
April 1906 events